Rothwell railway station is located on the Redcliffe Peninsula railway line serving the suburb of Rothwell in Moreton Bay Region, Queensland, Australia. It opened on 4 October 2016.

Services
Rothwell is served by trains operating from Kippa-Ring to Roma Street and Springfield Central. Some afternoon weekday services continue to Ipswich.

Services by platform

Transport links
Hornibrook Bus Lines operates one route to and from Rothwell station:
698: to Kippa-Ring station

Kangaroo Bus Lines operate two routes to and from Rothwell station:
662: to Deception Bay
665: to Deception Bay

References

Railway stations in Moreton Bay Region
Railway stations in Australia opened in 2016
Rothwell, Queensland